The Atlas of UTR Regulatory Activity (AURA), a biological database, now at its second version, is a manually curated and comprehensive catalog of human 5' and 3' untranslated sequences (UTR) and UTR regulatory annotations.
It includes basic annotation, phylogenetic conservation, binding sites for RNA-binding proteins and miRNA, cis-elements, RNA methylation and editing data, and more, for human and mouse. Through its intuitive web interface, it furthermore provides full access to a wealth of information that integrates RNA sequence and structure data, variation sites, gene synteny, gene and protein expression and gene functional descriptions from scientific literature and specialized databases. Eventually, it provides several tool for batch analysis of gene lists, allowing the tracing of post-transcriptional regulatory networks.

See also
 Five prime untranslated region
 MiRNA
 RNA-binding protein
 Three prime untranslated region
 Untranslated region

References

External links
 http://aura.science.unitn.it/.

Biological databases
RNA-binding proteins
RNA